Sogn Upper Secondary School was an upper secondary school at Ullevål in Oslo, Norway. The school was established as Sogn vocational school in 1961. For several years Sogn was Norway's largest Upper Secondary School.

In 2013 the school was disestablished and the educational programs were for the most part moved to Kuben Upper Secondary School, at Kuben Vocational Arena.

References

Secondary schools in Norway
Schools in Oslo
1961 establishments in Norway
Educational institutions established in 1961
2013 disestablishments in Norway